Calne railway station was opened on 3 November 1863 by the Great Western Railway as a terminus for their  Chippenham and Calne branch line from the Great Western Main Line junction at Chippenham. It was situated a short distance from Calne town centre and had only one platform. The station, when first opened, had its own engine shed.

In the early years the seven sidings were usually full due to the amount of traffic coming in from the nearby Chippenham railway station.

Following closure in 1965 as part of the nationwide Beeching Axe the buildings were left to be vandalised but were eventually taken down. A few years later the Station Road Industrial Estate was built on the site which in turn was replaced by a housing development in 2014.

References

External links
 Calne station on navigable 1948 O. S. map
 Calne station at Disused Stations

Disused railway stations in Wiltshire
Railway stations in Great Britain opened in 1863
Railway stations in Great Britain closed in 1965
Beeching closures in England
1863 establishments in England
1965 disestablishments in England
Former Great Western Railway stations
Calne